Ruritania is a fictional country, originally located in central Europe as a setting for novels by Anthony Hope, such as The Prisoner of Zenda (1894). Nowadays the term connotes a quaint minor European country, or is used as a placeholder name for an unspecified country in academic discussions. The first known use of the demonym Ruritanian was in 1896.

Hope's setting lent its name to a literary genre involving fictional countries, which is known as Ruritanian romance.

Fictional country
Jurists specialising in international law and private international law use Ruritania and other fictional countries when describing a hypothetical case illustrating some legal point. Australian foreign minister Alexander Downer cited Ruritania as a fictional enemy when illustrating a security treaty between Australia and Indonesia signed on 8 November 2006: "We do not need to have a security agreement with Indonesia so both of us will fight off the Ruritanians. That's not what the relationship is about," he said. "It is all about working together on the threats that we have to deal with, which are different types of threats." Similarly, a British court, when contemplating a publication ban relating to a childhood sexual assault case, referred to the country of origin of the child as "Ruritania", further explaining, "The boy was described in the judgment as having 'dual British and Ruritanian nationality'."

Economist Ludwig von Mises discussed currency reform for Ruritania and its "rurs" in the expanded edition of The Theory of Money and Credit (1912), chapter 23. He also references it in Human Action. Murray Rothbard, a former student of von Mises, also mentions the fictional country in his own works.

Ruritania as in the central and southeastern Europe

Ruritania has also been used to describe the stereotypical development of nationalism in 19th-century Eastern Europe, by Ernest Gellner in Nations and Nationalism, in a pastiche of the historical narratives of nationalist movements among Poles, Czechs, Serbians, Romanians, etc. In this story, peasant Ruritanians living in the "Empire of Megalomania" developed national consciousness through the elaboration of a Ruritanian high culture by a small group of intellectuals responding to industrialization and labor migration.

Author and royal historian Theo Aronson, in his book Crowns in Conflict (1986), used the term to describe the semi-romantic and even tribal-like conditions of the Balkan and Romanian cultures before World War I. Walter Lippmann used the word to describe the stereotype that characterized the vision of international relations during and after the War.

Vesna Goldsworthy of Kingston University, in her book Inventing Ruritania: the imperialism of the imagination (Yale University Press, 1998), addresses the question of the impact of the work of novelists and film-makers in shaping international perceptions of the Balkans in the framework of an anti-Western type of modernism which has received much criticism from other academics. Goldsworthy's  theories consider stories and movies about Ruritania to be a form of "literary exploitation" or "narrative colonization" of the peoples of the Balkans.

While discussing how new revolutionary leadership consciously or unconsciously may inherit certain elements of the previous regime Benedict Anderson in his book the Imagined Communities mentions among others examples "Josip Broz's revival of Ruritanian pomp and ceremony."

During the Suez Crisis in 1956 'Ruritania' was used as a euphemism for Egypt during discussions of the crisis on BBC Radio 4's programme Any Questions?, in order to circumvent the terms of an agreement preventing the broadcast of details of events prior to their discussion in parliament.

See also 

 Borduria and Syldavia 
 Grand Fenwick
 Latveria
 Lugash
 Orsinia

References

External links
The Ruritanian Resistance contains descriptions of the country

Fictional elements introduced in 1894
Fictional European countries
Placeholder names
Fictional kingdoms